Tidal is the adjectival form of tide.

Tidal may also refer to:
 Tidal (album), a 1996 album by Fiona Apple
 Tidal (king), a king involved in the Battle of the Vale of Siddim
 TidalCycles, a live coding environment for music
 Tidal (service), a music streaming service
 Tidal, Manitoba, Canada
 Tidal station, Tidal, Manitoba
 Tidal: Occupy Theory, Occupy Strategy, a magazine associated with the Occupy Wall Street movement

See also
 Tidal flow (traffic), the flow of traffic thought of as an analogy with the flow of tides
 Tidal force, a secondary effect of the force of gravity and is responsible for the tides
 Tide (disambiguation)